Charles Bird (born 9 September 1949) is an Irish journalist and broadcaster. He was Chief News Correspondent with RTÉ News and Current Affairs until January 2009. He took up the role of Washington Correspondent, but prematurely returned to his earlier post in Ireland in June 2010. He retired from RTÉ in August 2012.

Early life
Bird was born in Sandymount, Dublin in 1949. He was educated at Sandymount High School.

In the late 1960s, Bird took an active interest in far-left politics, being a member of Young Socialists. In this role, along with Tariq Ali of the International Marxist Group, he attended the funeral of Peter Graham of Saor Éire who was assassinated on 25 October 1971 in an internecine dispute. A photograph of the funeral shows Ali and Bird giving a clenched fist salute at the grave.

In the early 1970s Bird joined Official Sinn Féin (later Sinn Féin: the Workers' Party) and in 1973 was their director of elections in Dublin South-Central, but in 2022 claimed he left shortly thereafter and had only been involved with the party for a few months. Subsequently, Bird was recruited into RTÉ by Workers' Party member Eoghan Harris in the mid-1970s.

For a period Bird was a member of the Labour Party but left after Noel Browne walked out of the party following the 1977 Labour party conference in Cork.

Career

1990s
For many years in the 1990s, Bird was the only point of contact between RTÉ and the Provisional IRA. He witnessed first-hand the ceasefires and the subsequent twists and turns of the peace process. On the international front, Bird reported on the Gulf War and was in Syria for the release of Brian Keenan in 1990. He covered the outbreak of the Somali Civil War in the early 90s and the Rwandan genocide in 1994.

In 1998, Bird and his colleague George Lee broke the story about a tax evasion scheme being operated by National Irish Bank, in which the bank was offering customers looking to avoid tax offshore investment schemes in the Isle of Man. For this, both men were awarded "Journalist of the Year".

However, while the NIB story represented a professional highpoint, the aftermath represented a low one; "the worst time of my life" as Bird described it in 2006. During his coverage of the NIB story, Bird reported that Beverly Flynn had assisted clients of the bank in evading tax by funnelling undeclared income to Clerical Medical schemes based in the Isle of Man. Flynn denied the claims and sued RTÉ for libel. What followed was "the longest-running libel case in the history of the state". The matter went to the Irish High Court in 2001; a jury found that while RTÉ was unable to prove its case, they also stated that the allegations levelled against Flynn were substantially true. Thus, Flynn was judged to have "won" the case, but was awarded no damages. Flynn appealed the matter to the Supreme court, but lost, but continued to legally pursue the matter. The issue was never fully settled until 2007, when RTÉ agreed to settle with Flynn to the sum of €1.24 million. That became a controversy in itself, with the public outraged that ultimately the taxpayer would have to foot such a steep bill, as well as accusations that Taoiseach Bertie Ahern was involved and had encouraged RTÉ to settle.

2000s
In the early 2000s covered a number of major international news stories for RTÉ News such as the September 11 attacks in New York and the 2004 Indian Ocean earthquake and tsunami. He also covered domestic stories such as a 2004 horse-doping scandal including Cian O'Connor and the story of the Colombia Three, three Irish Republicans charged with providing training to FARC rebels.

Bird was awarded an honorary doctorate from University College Dublin in 2002.

Bird was attacked during the Dublin Riots of 25 February 2006, suffering a fractured cheekbone, soft tissue damage and bruising. On RTÉ News broadcasts later that evening, he spoke of his personal experience—and of how his assailants had recognised him and called him an "Orange Bastard". Witnesses included Sunday Independent journalist Daniel McConnell, who reported on the event the following day. Bird's appearance on the Six O'Clock News was criticised by The Sunday Times in its edition the following day, as it felt "Bird makes himself the story". In 2008, a man pleaded guilty to violent disorder and assaulting Bird.

He presented the Charlie Bird Explores series in 2006, 2007 and 2008. In this collection of documentary programmes, he visited the Amazon, the Ganges, and the Arctic.

On 7 October 2008, Bird was announced as the latest person to fill the post of RTÉ News and Current Affairs Washington correspondent. His first report as Washington correspondent was on the Nine O'Clock bulletin about US Airways Flight 1549. RTÉ received 30 complaints after he "failed to wear a suit and tie" on Six One during coverage of the death of Ted Kennedy.

2010s
Bird provided coverage from the 2010 Haiti earthquake in January 2010. A two-part documentary about his first year in the United States was broadcast later that month on RTÉ One. In it he spoke of his "madness" in moving to the country and his lack of contacts and recognition in Washington DC. At the end of the second programme, he announced he would vacate his Washington post. Early viewing figures suggested that the two programmes got viewing averages of 473,000 and 563,000 people. RTÉ cited Bird's "popularity" when asked about the large audience.

Bird returned to Ireland to take up his previous job of Chief News Correspondent with RTÉ in June 2010. He covered a high-profile leadership challenge of Enda Kenny on his return. The Washington role was filled by Richard Downes. During August 2010, Bird began presenting The Marian Finucane Show. Bird retired from RTÉ on 26 August 2012; his last broadcast was presenting The Marian Finucane Show on RTÉ Radio 1.

He presented Tonight with Vincent Browne on TV3 between 29 August and 1 September 2016.

In 2016,  he published A Day in May in response to those by the Thirty-fourth Amendment of the Constitution of Ireland. In 2018, sections of this publication were used as part of a play by the same name in the Olympia Theatre, Dublin.

Personal life and health
On 27 October 2021, Bird announced that he had developed Motor neurone disease, after experiencing problems with his voice. He subsequently announced "Climb For Charlie", a campaign where he and other celebrities would climb Croagh Patrick to raise awareness of the condition.

On 12 June 2022, the Sunday World reported that Bird had selected his burial place. The following day RTÉ broadcast a programme about his five decades in journalism.

Notes

References

External links

 
 Webchat and biography with Charlie Bird

1949 births
20th-century Irish people
21st-century Irish people
Former Marxists
Living people
People from Sandymount
People with motor neuron disease
RTÉ Radio 1 presenters
RTÉ newsreaders and journalists
RTÉ television presenters
The Panel (Irish TV series) presenters
Workers' Party (Ireland) politicians
Labour Party (Ireland) politicians